Bang Pahan is a district (amphoe) in the northern part of Ayutthaya province.

History
The district was originally named Nakhon Luang Nai, but was renamed in 1916 to Bang Pahan as the name of the central tambon.

The Phuan people from Vientiane who migrated around this area in the reign of King Rama II established the settlement. They also built a windmill in their village, thus the village was named Ban Kanghan after the Thai word for windmill (Kanghan, กังหัน). The name was later corrupted by misspellings to Pahan.

Geography
Neighboring districts are (from the north clockwise) Maha Rat, Nakhon Luang, Phra Nakhon Si Ayutthaya and Bang Ban of Ayutthaya province, and Pa Mok of Ang Thong province.

Administration
The district is divided into 17 sub-districts tambon, which are further subdivided into 94 villages muban. The township (thesaban tambon) of Bang Pahan covers tambon Khwan Mueang and parts of the tambon Bang Pahan and Bang Nang Ra.

References

Bang Pahan